Adriano Paolucci (born ) is an Italian male volleyball player. He is part of the Italy men's national volleyball team. On club level he plays for Sir Safety Umbria Volley.

References

External links
 profile at FIVB.org

1979 births
Living people
Italian men's volleyball players
Place of birth missing (living people)
21st-century Italian people